Transurethral incision of the prostate (TUIP or TIP) is a surgical procedure for treating prostate gland enlargement (benign prostatic hyperplasia).

Benefits
Transurethral incision of the prostate-—one or two small cuts in the prostate gland—can improve urine flow and correct other problems related to an enlarged prostate.

Indications
Compared with other surgical procedures for prostate gland enlargement, TUIP is simpler and generally has fewer complications. However, TUIP can only be used when the prostate is relatively small.

See also 
 Transurethral needle ablation of the prostate
 Prostatectomy
 Prostatic stent
 TURP

References

External links
 Mayo Clinic description

Male genital surgery
Prostatic procedures